Joshua Carlton Eserovweoghene E.A. Ibuanokpe (born 16 January 1996) is an English rugby union prop for Saracens in Premiership Rugby.

Career
Ibuanokpe made his debut for Harlequins on 5 November 2017 in an Anglo-Welsh Cup game against Saracens, Ibuanokpe scored the winning try. Ibuanokpe renewed his Harlequins contract on 23 February 2018.

On 30 April 2019 Ibuanokpe signed for Saracens.

Ibuanokpe graduated from the University of Bristol with a degree in Physics in July 2019.

References

1996 births
Living people
English rugby union players
Harlequin F.C. players
Rugby union players from Lambeth
Rugby union props
Saracens F.C. players